Crossing the Dust is a 2006 film directed by the Kurdish director Shawkat Amin Korki.

Plot
During the fall of Saddam in 2003, two Kurds, Azad and Rashid are looking for the parents of an Arab boy named Saddam. At the same time the boy's parents are looking for him everywhere, worried because his name is now taboo. All the attempts of the two Kurds to get rid of the child fail: neither the Americans nor clerics at the mosque want him. Little Saddam begins to become a real problem. Azad overcomes ethnic differences and tries to help the boy find his parents, much to the objections of Rashid, whose family was wiped out by Iraqi troops under Saddam during the anti-Kurdish campaign in the 1980s. Azad is killed while trying to protect the boy from Saddam's troops, who want to take him back. Rashid puts aside his animosity and carries on with the task of helping the boy find his parents.

Cast
 Adil Abdolrahman		
 Ayam Akram		
 Hussein Hassan		
 Ahlam Najat		
 Aba Rash		
 Rizgar Sedi

Awards
 Best Director, Silver Screen Award, Singapore International Film Festival, 2007.
 First Feature Award, 9th Osian Film Festival, New Delhi, 2007.
 Golden Alhambra at 1st Granada (Cines Del Sur) IFF, (Spain) 2007
 bronze Alhambra at 1st Granada (Cines Del Sur) IFF, (Spain) 2007
 Critic (Netpak) Award at 20th Singapore IFF 2007
 Golden Hanoman as best film at 2nd Jogja Asia Netpak IFF – Indonesia 2007
 Special Mention at 11 Tallinn Black Nights International Film festival 2007
 Nominee for achievement in Directing at Asia Pacific Screen Awards 2002
 Bronze prize at 5th Masqat International film Festival – Oman 2008
 Best film Award at Perspective film festival – Antwerpen, Belgium 2007
 Gran prix at Arte Mare film festival - France 2008

References

External links

2006 films
2006 drama films
Kurdish films
English-language Kurdish films
Kurdish-language films
2000s Arabic-language films
2006 multilingual films